The Begolli are an Albanian noble family which rose to prominence in present-day Kosovo in the Ottoman era and were an influential feudal family in the region.

The Begolli were influential in Rrafshi i Dukagjinit (Metohije) area, Plav-Gusinje, and down to Shkodër. They were landowners and held private armies.

Their first known member may have been Mere Hüseyin Pasha, Grand Vizier of the Ottoman Empire in the 16th century.

Notable members
Qerim Begolli, delegate at Assembly of Vlora and Albanian Congress of Trieste.
Qazim Begolli, activist of kachak movement, member of Committee for the National Defence of Kosovo.
Refat Begolli, politician, Albanian Minister of Economy of Ibrahim Biçakçiu's cabinet (7 September – 25 October 1944).
Faruk Begolli (1944–2007), Albanian actor and director.
Mahmut Pasha of Begolli, Ottoman-Albanian governor and military commander

See also
Vrioni family

References

Ottoman Albanian nobility
People from Peja
Albanian noble families